Nathaniel William "Nat" Niles (July 5, 1886 – July 11, 1932) was an American tennis player and figure skater who competed in single skating, pair skating, and ice dancing between 1914 and 1932. He was born in Boston, Massachusetts and died in Brookline, Massachusetts.

Niles won the U.S. Figure Skating Championships in men's single skating three times and nine national pair skating titles with his partner Theresa Weld Blanchard. Blanchard and Niles also won a five national titles in ice dancing.

Nathaniel W. Niles also excelled at tennis, and was inducted into the New England Tennis Hall of Fame in 2000. While a student at Harvard, he was an NCAA champion for the sport. He competed in 23 successive U.S. National Championships. With Edith Rotch, he won the 1908 mixed doubles title, and in 1917, he reached the singles final, losing to Robert Lindley Murray in four sets. He also reached the semifinals in 1913 and the quarterfinals in 1904, 1911 and 1918.

Niles died in 1932 at the age of 46. His last figure skating competition, with Blanchard, had been the pairs event at the 1932 World Figure Skating Championships earlier the same year.

Figure skating results

Singles career

Pairs career
(with Theresa Weld Blanchard)

Tennis Grand Slam finals

Singles (1 runner-up)

Mixed doubles (1 title)

References

External links
 
 
 
  
  

1886 births
1932 deaths
Sportspeople from Brookline, Massachusetts
American male single skaters
American male pair skaters
American male ice dancers
Harvard Crimson men's tennis players
Olympic figure skaters of the United States
Figure skaters at the 1920 Summer Olympics
Figure skaters at the 1924 Winter Olympics
Figure skaters at the 1928 Winter Olympics
Grand Slam (tennis) champions in mixed doubles
American male tennis players
United States National champions (tennis)
Figure skaters from Boston
Tennis players from Boston